Valonne is a commune in the Doubs department in the Bourgogne-Franche-Comté region in eastern France.

Geography 
On the south is the valley of the Barbèche, and on the north the massif of Lomont, which rises to 850 m. From the heights, there is a splendid view toward the department of Haute-Saône, the Vosges Mountains, the Pays de Montbéliard, and Alsace. In the other direction, one can see the Jura mountains, and on a clear day, the Alps.

Population

See also
 Communes of the Doubs department

References

External links

 Valonne on the regional Web site 

Communes of Doubs